Robin Riker (born October 2, 1952) is an American actress and author. She made her big screen debut in the 1980 horror film Alligator and later went to star in the Showtime comedy series Brothers (1984–1989).

Riker had starring roles in a number of sitcoms during 1990s, include Get a Life (1990–92), Shaky Ground (1992–93), Thunder Alley (1994–95), and The Gregory Hines Show (1997–99). From 2008 to 2010 she played the role of Beth Logan in the CBS daytime soap opera The Bold and the Beautiful.

Early life
Riker was born in New York City. Both of her parents were in theater. She began acting in theater when she was two years old.

Career
Riker began her career appearing in episodes of M*A*S*H, Fantasy Island and The Rockford Files and The A-Team. She made her film debut appearing as a female lead in the 1980 horror film Alligator.From 1984 to 1989, she starred as Kelly Hall in the Showtime comedy series Brothers. She received two CableACE Award nominations for Best Actress in a Comedy Series. She also appeared in films Stepmonster (1993), A Reason to Believe (1995), Brink! (1998) and Don't Look Under the Bed (1999).

During 1990s, Riker had starring roles in a number of sitcoms, include Get a Life (1990-92), Shaky Ground (1992-93), Thunder Alley (1994-95), and The Gregory Hines Show (1997-99). She guest starred on Murder, She Wrote, Sabrina the Teenage Witch, Buffy the Vampire Slayer, Malcolm in the Middle, Reba, NCIS, Boston Legal, Bones, Justified and The Glades.

In 2000, Riker began appearing in a daytime soap opera Days of Our Lives. In 2005, she was named by KCL Productions to dress up as Princess Peach mascot to do Mario Superstar Baseball commercial. After, she signed a contract for the CBS soap opera The Bold and the Beautiful in the recast role of Beth Logan. Her first appearance was on June 18, 2008. Riker continues to work in stages from Los Angeles to New York and to receive nominations for her work in the theatre. In 2013, she provided the voice and motion capture for Lilith in the video game DmC: Devil May Cry. In May 2016, Riker was hired to portray the recurring role of Naomi Dreyfus on the ABC daytime soap opera General Hospital. She played the role from June 3, 2016 to September 21, 2016.

Filmography

Films

Television

Episodic – Guest Star

Theatre
 Ladies' Room (1988; Tiffany Theatre Los Angeles)
 The Kiss at City Hall (2000; Pasadena Playhouse; Victim Dramalogue Award Winner Stage Coach Theatre
 Sex, Sex, Sex, Sex, Sex and Sex (2005; The Matrix Theatre)
 I Remember You (2006; Falcon Theatre)
 Welcome to the Woods (2009; off-Broadway)
 Cannibals (2010) Zephyr Theatre
 Les Liaisons Dangereuses (The Blank Theatre Company)
 All My Sons (Geffen Playhouse)
 Pied a Terre Off Broadway

References

External links
 
 

1952 births
20th-century American actresses
21st-century American actresses
Actresses from New York City
American film actresses
American soap opera actresses
American stage actresses
American television actresses
Living people